The Volane is a  French river, a tributary of the Ardèche and a sub-affluent of the Rhône.

Geography 
It runs through (among others) the towns of Antraigues-sur-Volane and Vals-les-Bains.

Communes 
The river runs through eight communes:
 faring downstream : Mézilhac, Laviolle,  Antraigues-sur-Volane, Genestelle, Asperjoc, Saint-Andéol-de-Vals, Vals-les-Bains, Labégude (confluence).

Tributaries 

The Volane has 21 official tributaries:
 ruisseau de Larbonnet (L) 2 km
 ruisseau des Hubertes (L) 1 km
 ruisseau du Crouzet (R) 3 km 
 ruisseau de Pradas (L) 1 km
 ruisseau de Rocheplate (R) 1 km
 ruisseau de Fournier (L) 1 km
 ruisseau de Varneyre (R) 3 km
 ruisseau de la Sapède (R) 2 km
 ruisseau de Fontfreyde (R) 1 km
 ruisseau de Rouyon (R) 2 km
 ruisseau du Bouchet (R) 2 km
 ruisseau des Fuels (R) 2 km
 ruisseau de Bise (L) 9 km
 ruisseau de Coupe (R) 2 km
 ruisseau de Pra Michel (L) 1 km
 ruisseau de la Borie (L) 1 km
 ruisseau de la Combe (R) 1 km
 ruisseau de la Chadeyre (L) 1 km
 la Bézorgues (R) 19 km
 ruisseau de Rouchon (L) 1 km
 le Voltour (R) 7 km

Topography 

Ecology 
La Volane is a piscicole stream of 1st category (lush in trout and other salmonids).
.

Culture 

The Volane is photographed in "A book of the Cévennes" by Sabine Baring-Gould.

Toponym 
The Volane gave its name to Antraigues-sur-Volane.

References 

Rivers of France
Rivers of Auvergne-Rhône-Alpes
Rivers of Ardèche